Rewind is a South Korea variety show program that was aired on Channel A and broadcast by Channel A on Wednesdays 9.30pm KST.

Synopsis 
This is a new type of game show where the casts goes back in time to answer relevant questions asked by the host based on the specific year. In addition, each group will also get to invest with their Rewind Money and whichever group that earns the most will be the winner.

Cast

MC 
 Kim Sung-joo

Present Members 
 Park Myeong-su
 
 Kim Jong-kook
 Yang Se-chan
 Haha
 Lee Ji-hye

Past members 
 Park Kyung (Block B) - Ep 1-16
 Haon - Ep 1-16
 Jinsol (April) - Ep 1-16

Episodes 
 – Team(s) that had won
 – Team(s) that had lost

Ratings 
 Ratings listed below are the individual corner ratings of Rewind. (Note: Individual corner ratings do not include commercial time, which regular ratings include.)

Notes

References

External links 
 Official website 

South Korean variety television shows
South Korean television talk shows
2019 South Korean television series debuts
2020 South Korean television series endings
Korean-language television shows
Channel A (TV channel) original programming